Chelleh Khaneh (also Romanized as Chelleh Khāneh) is a village in Aghmiyun Rural District, in the Central District of Sarab County, East Azerbaijan Province, Iran. At the 2006 census, its population was 93, in 14 families.

References 

Populated places in Sarab County